The San Monta Tapes is a side-project of The Future Sound of London, under the pseudonym Heads of Agreement, described by them as "Experiments in polyrhythmic". It is described as very unmelodic with sparse percussion loops, thus an unusual experiment and departure from the "usual" FSOL sound. In the Freeze magazine interview Cobain suggests that the project is more Brian's work than his.

Track listing
 Yellow Way (6:48)
 Elongate (5:53)
 San Monta (3:12)
 Antique (3:15)
 Earth Magnetic (4:54)
 Still Movements (5:09)
 La Veshter Du Aumbre (4:24)
 Low Cloud (2:16)
 Bump (5:15)
 Ukashan (3:42)
 Slow Storm (1:35)
 Northern Desert (0:34)
 Cold Ground (3:36)
 Waves (6:01)
 Underpass (0:42)
 Coasts (3:46)
 Tree Bark (1:36)
 Cow Fxd (4:33)
 Pushed (1:32)

Crew
Brian Dougans, Garry Cobain.

References

External links
 Heads Of Agreement – The San Monta Tapes tracklist at FSOLdigital

The Future Sound of London albums
2007 albums